South Miami station is a station on the Metrorail rapid transit system in South Miami, Florida. This station is located at the intersection of South Dixie Highway (US 1) and Sunset Drive (SW 72nd Street/SR 986), two blocks west of Red Road (West 57th Avenue). It opened to service May 20, 1984.

South Miami provides access to The Shops at Sunset Place, as well as a number of local hospitals.

Station layout
The station has two tracks served by an island platform, with a parking garage immediately west of the platform.

References

External links

MDT – Metrorail Stations
 Station from Google Maps Street View

Green Line (Metrorail)
Orange Line (Metrorail)
Metrorail (Miami-Dade County) stations in Miami-Dade County, Florida
Railway stations in the United States opened in 1984
1984 establishments in Florida